The 1977–78 Alpha Ethniki was the 42nd season of the highest football league of Greece. The season began on 11 September 1977 and ended on 28 May 1978. AEK Athens won their sixth Greek title and their first one in seven years.

The point system was: Win: 2 points - Draw: 1 point.

League table

Results

Top scorers

External links
Greek Wikipedia
Official Greek FA Site
Greek SuperLeague official Site
SuperLeague Statistics

Alpha Ethniki seasons
Greece
1977–78 in Greek football leagues